The Vail Mountaineer was at max volume a 12,000-circulation free daily newspaper distributed in the Eagle Valley Tuesday-Saturday.
Now defunct, it was founded by Jim Pavelich, who started the Vail Daily in 1984 and sold it in 1993. The name "mountaineer" is a tribute to the U.S. Army's 10th Mountain Division, which fought World War II on skis. Many members of this honored unit relocated to the Vail area.

Pavelich started the Mountaineer because he became frustrated over the editorial direction of the Vail Daily, which he said seemed to be written and edited by people who didn't want to live in a ski resort.

He told realvail.com: “It was the biggest tourist holiday of the year, and the big headline on the front page, and I’m paraphrasing, said something like, ‘I hate living here.’ And although I don't remember the details, I remember that the headline was so unbelievably negative about nothing."
Labeling 

The Vail Mountaineer folded without notice or remark on June 1, 2011. 
As with his struggling Denver Daily News, Pavelich pulled the plug on the Mountaineer without preserving its archives and has since gone into the restaurant business

External links
Vail Mountaineer

Newspapers published in Colorado
Free daily newspapers